The General is an Irish crime film written and directed by John Boorman about Dublin crime boss Martin Cahill, who undertook several daring heists in the early 1980s and attracted the attention of the Garda Síochána, IRA and Ulster Volunteer Force. The film was shot in 1997 and released in 1998. Brendan Gleeson plays Cahill, Adrian Dunbar plays his friend Noel Curley, and Jon Voight plays Inspector Ned Kenny.

Plot
The story of Dubliner Martin Cahill, who pulled off two daring robberies but came into conflict with members of his gang and attracted attention from the police and the IRA, and whose dealings with the UVF ultimately led to his downfall.

Cast
 Brendan Gleeson as Martin Cahill
 Adrian Dunbar as Noel Curley
 Sean McGinley as Gary
 Maria Doyle Kennedy as Frances
 Angeline Ball as Tina
 Jon Voight as Inspector Ned Kenny
 Eanna MacLiam as Jimmy
 Tom Murphy as Willie Byrne
 Paul Hickey as Anthony
 Tommy O'Neill as Paddy
 John O'Toole as Shea
 Ciarán Fitzgerald as Tommy
 Ned Dennehy as Gay
 Vinny Murphy as Harry (as Vinnie Murphy)
 Roxanna Williams as Orla

Production 
The film is based on the book of the same name by Irish journalist Paul Williams, who is "Special Correspondent" for the Irish Independent.

Director Boorman was himself one of Cahill's burglary victims. This event is dramatised in a scene in which Cahill breaks into a home, stealing a gold record and pilfering a watch from the wrist of a sleeping woman. The gold record, which Cahill later breaks in disgust after discovering it is not made of gold, was awarded for the score of Deliverance, Boorman's best-known film.

Filming was at various locations around Dublin, including South Lotts and Ranelagh. Although shot in colour, the theatrical release of the film was presented in black-and-white for artistic reasons, while an alternate version of the desaturated original colour print was subsequently made available for television broadcast and home video. Asked why he chose to depict Cahill's life in black-and-white, Boorman later explained: 
I love black-and-white, and since I was making the film independently — I borrowed the money from the bank — there was no one to tell me I couldn't. If I had made [The General] for a studio, they wouldn't let me do that. The other reason, the main reason, was because it was about recent events and people who were still alive. I wanted to give it a little distance. Black-and-white gives you that sort of parallel world. Also, it's very close to the condition of dreaming, to the unconscious. I wanted it to have this mythic level because I felt this character was an archetype. All throughout history, you find this rebel, this violent, funny, brilliant kind of character. I wanted to make that kind of connection, and black-and-white film helps. Up until the middle to late '60s, it was a choice to film in black-and-white or color. But then television became so vital to a film's finance, and television won't show black-and-white. So that killed it off, really.

Reception 
The General holds an approval rating of 82% based on 49 reviews on website Rotten Tomatoes.

The film grossed £1.6 million in the UK and Ireland, the second highest-grossing Irish film of the year, behind The Butcher Boy. In the United States and Canada it grossed $1.2 million for a worldwide estimated total of $3.8 million.

The film garnered multiple awards for Gleeson's performance and Boorman's directing, with some critics speculating the former would earn an Academy Award nomination. Boorman won the award for Best Director at the 1998 Cannes Film Festival. Though Gleeson was not nominated for an Oscar, his performance was awarded by the Boston Society of Film Critics, the London Film Critics' Circle, and the Irish Film and Television Academy.

Awards and nominations

See also
 List of films featuring diabetes

References

External links 
 
 
 
 
 

1998 films
1998 crime drama films
1990s heist films
Irish crime drama films
Irish heist films
British crime drama films
British heist films
English-language Irish films
Biographical films about criminals
Films about The Troubles (Northern Ireland)
Films about the Irish Republican Army
Films about organised crime in Ireland
Films based on biographies
Films set in Dublin (city)
Films shot in Dublin (city)
Films directed by John Boorman
Sony Pictures Classics films
1998 independent films
1990s English-language films
1990s British films